Neil William Ashcroft (27 November 1938 – 15 March 2021) was a British solid-state physicist.

Early life and education
Ashcroft was born in London on 27 November 1938, and migrated to New Zealand in 1947. He was educated at Hutt Valley High School, and completed his undergraduate studies at Victoria University College, earning a Bachelor of Science degree, in 1958. He received his PhD in 1964 from the University of Cambridge for research investigating the Fermi surfaces of metals.

Career
Following his PhD, Ashcroft completed postdoctoral research at the University of Chicago and at Cornell University, where he became a Professor in 1975.  In 1990 he was named the Horace White Professor of Physics, and was elected to emeritus status in 2006.

He served as the director for the Laboratory of Atomic and Solid State Physics at Cornell University (1979–1984), the director for the Cornell Center for Materials Research (1997–2000), and as the deputy director for the High Energy Synchrotron Source (1990–1997).

Between 1986 and 1987, he served as the head of the Condensed Matter division of the American Physical Society. His textbook on solid-state physics, written with N. David Mermin, is a standard text in the field.

Ashcroft died in Ithaca, New York, on 15 March 2021.

Awards and honours
In 1997, Ashcroft was elected to the U.S. National Academy of Sciences.

In 2003, he was awarded the Bridgman Award for his contributions to high-pressure physics. Since that date, he was therefore an honorary member of the AIRAPT.

References 

1938 births
British physicists
Alumni of the University of Cambridge
Cornell University faculty
Cornell Laboratory of Atomic and Solid State Physics
2021 deaths
Members of the United States National Academy of Sciences
Foreign Members of the Russian Academy of Sciences
Victoria University of Wellington alumni
Scientists from London
Fellows of the American Physical Society
University of Chicago staff
British expatriates in the United States
English emigrants to New Zealand
People educated at Hutt Valley High School